Pinmore railway station served the hamlet of Pinmore, South Ayrshire, Scotland from 1877 to 1965 on the Girvan and Portpatrick Junction Railway.

History 
The station opened on 5 October 1877 by the Girvan and Portpatrick Junction Railway. To the west was the goods yard and to the northeast was the signal box. The station closed on 7 February 1882 but reopened nine days later on 16 February 1882. It closed again on 12 April 1886, reopened on 14 June 1886 and finally closed on 6 September 1965.

The local folklore legend known as "The Charles" also is said to have visited the station in March 1886.

References

External links 

Disused railway stations in South Ayrshire
Railway stations in Great Britain opened in 1877
Railway stations in Great Britain closed in 1965
Beeching closures in Scotland
Former Glasgow and South Western Railway stations
1877 establishments in Scotland
1965 disestablishments in Scotland